Agouza is one of nine municipal districts that form Giza city, which is part of the Greater Cairo metropolis, on the western bank of the river Nile. It is situated between 6th October Bridge and 15 May Bridge and is north of Dokki and south of Imbaba. Most of it is colloquially known as Mohandessin, a 1950s planned community originally called Madinat al-Awqaf, sub-divided in to a number of profession-based housing cooperatives, one of which was for engineers (mohandissin).

The Egyptian National Circus and the adjoining Balloon Theater are on the Agouza Corniche. The British Council main centre in Egypt is also on the Corniche.

History 
Agouza used to be a mostly royal and state-owned agricultural estate held under waqf (endowment) until the early 20th Century with villages, such as Mit Okba, and 'izbas (hamlets) such as al-Hutiyya.  From the 1930s the Ministry of Awqaf piloted plans to turn the estates into a new suburban district of Cairo as Dokki to its south flourished. In 1948, its chief architect Mahmoud Riad set out the final plan of Madinat al-Awqaf, with plots being advertised for sale that year.

Much of this development along with smaller developments to its south made up the Wasat (middle) district in the city of Giza, before being divided in 1997 into the districts of Agouza (most of which is Madinat al-Awqaf/Mohandessin) and Dokki, (the other half of Madinat al-Aqaf plus other developments) with most of Agouza known colloqially as Mohandeseen, even though it is a smaller non-administrative shiakha (census block) within it (see Demographics below).

Origin of the name 
There are two contesting stories explaining the origin of Agouza's name.

The first is that in the 1940s and 1950s, an old woman (agouza in Arabic) sat alongside the Corniche and sold coffee to cars passing by. When people wanted to meet up, they would say "I'm at the agouza," and the name just stuck. The story is unverified however.

The second, perhaps more likely story, is that the name refers to Nazly Hanem, the wife of Sherif Pacha who was Prime Minister at the time of Mohamed Ali in the 1800s. At the age of 80 she decided to build a mosque to fulfill her husband's wish after his death. Given her old age people referred to the mosque as Al Agouza which later became the name of the whole district.

Nawal Street 
After Abdel Rehim Pacha Sabry's daughter Nawal died at the age of 6, he named his palace (now the Military Nasr Academy) after her, which led to its street being named Nawal Street.

Demographics and sub-districts 
The district of Agouza had a population of 278,479 in 2017, 143,681 male and 134,798 female. It is made of six shiakhas:

Notable places

Hospitals 
 Al-Agouza Hospital

Restaurants and night life 

 Niema, Shawerma and typical Egyptian food: situated at the junction of Naguib Mahfooz Street and the Corniche
 Flying Fish: situated on the Corniche
 Sea Gull: situated on the Corniche
 Cairo Jazz Club

Hotels 
 Hotel Shahrazad

Libraries 
 6 October Public Library

References